Ilyin or Ilin is a Russian masculine surname that is derived from the male given name Ilya and literally means Ilya's. its feminine counterpart is Ilyina or Ilina. It may refer to

 Aleksandr Ilyin (disambiguation), several people
 Aleksei Ilyin (disambiguation), several people
 Alin Ilin (born 1984), Romanian football player
 Anatoli Ilyin (1931–2016), Soviet Russian football player
 Andrey Ilin (born 1960), Russian film and theatre actor
 Dmitry Ilyin (born 1984), Russian fine art and documentary street photographer
 Efraim Ilin (1912–2011), Israeli tycoon and security expert
 Fyodor Ilyin (1892–1939), Soviet admiral and diplomat
 Gleb Ilyin (1889–1968), Russian-American painter
 Ilya Ilin (born 1988), Kazakhstani weightlifter
 Ivan Ilyin (1883–1954), Russian religious and political philosopher
 Kostiantyn Ilin (born 1975), Ukrainian strongman competitor
 Lev Ilyin (1880–1942), Russian architect
 Mikhail Ilyin (1903–1981), Soviet art historian and Moscow expert
 Natalya Ilina (born 1985), Kazakhstani handball player
 Nikolai Ilyin (sniper) (1922–1943), Soviet World War II sniper
 Nikolai Ilyin (Yehowist) (1809–1890), Russian religious thinker and founder of the movement of Yehowists
 Olga Ilina (born 1995), Russian rhythmic gymnast
 Olga Ilyin, Russian-born American poet and novelist
 Sergei Ilyin (born 1968), Russian football player
 Vasily Ilyin (1949–2015), Soviet handball player
 Vera Ilyina (born 1974), Russian diver
 Victoria Ilina (born 1999), Russian rhythmic gymnast
 Viktor Ilyin (born 1947), Russian deserter from the Soviet Army
 Vladimir Ilyin (disambiguation), several people
 Yekaterina Ilyina (born 1991), Russian handball player
 Yuriy (Yuri) Ilyin
 Yuriy Ilyin (born 1962), Ukrainian Admiral and Chief of the General Staff
 Yuri Ilyin (born 1968), Kazakhstani politician, Minister of Emergency Situations
 Zoltan Ilin (born 1955), Yugoslavian tennis player 

Russian-language surnames